Eva Didur (born 1896), also known as Ewa Didur, was a Polish dramatic soprano singer.

Early life
Eva Didur was born in Poland, the daughter of Polish singer Adamo Didur and his first wife, Mexican singer Angela Aranda Arellano. Her younger sisters were Mary Didur-Załuska (1905-1979) and Olga Didur-Wiktorowa (1900-1963), who were also professional singers. Eva Didur studied voice with William Thorner and Gina Ciaparelli-Viafora.

Career

Didur had her concert debut at the Metropolitan Opera House in 1918, a concert in which she "exhibited a fine, powerful powerful soprano and decided dramatic temperament." She sang at the Hippodrome with her father in December 1918. She went on to Italy in 1919, where she sang the part of Mimi in La bohème in Milan. She was engaged to sing in Trieste during the 1919-1920 opera season. In 1921 she was back in Milan to sing the part of Marguerite in Mefistofele, under the direction of her godfather, Arturo Toscanini.

Didur sang at many benefit events during World War I. In 1917 she performed at a concert with pianists Ignacy Jan Paderewski and Zygmunt Stojowski for the Polish Victims War Relief Fund. She performed with her father at a benefit for the Russian Relief Fund at Carnegie Hall, and at another benefit for the Polish Army Hospital in France, at Aeolian Hall, a few weeks later. In the summer of 1918 she sang the Polish national anthem and other music at a "Polish Night" stadium concert in New York, under the direction of Arnold Volpe, and at a Red Cross benefit concert on Long Island.

Personal life
As a young woman Eva Didur was close friends with silent film actress Dagmar Godowsky.

References

1896 births
Year of death missing
Polish operatic sopranos
Polish people of Mexican descent
20th-century Polish women opera singers